Liam Thomas Cosgrave (born 30 April 1956) is an Irish former Fine Gael politician who served as Leas-Chathaoirleach of Seanad Éireann from 1997 to 2002, Cathaoirleach of Seanad Éireann from 1996 to 1997 and a Senator for the Industrial and Commercial Panel from 1993 to 2002. He previously served as a Teachta Dála (TD) for the Dún Laoghaire constituency from 1981 to 1987.

Coming from a political family, he is the son of Taoiseach Liam Cosgrave and grandson of the first President of the Executive Council W. T. Cosgrave.

Politics
He was elected to Dáil Éireann at the 1981 general election as a Fine Gael TD for Dún Laoghaire, and re-elected at the February 1982 and November 1982 general elections. He lost his seat at the 1987 general election, and was unsuccessful again at the 1989 and 1992 general elections.

He was elected to Seanad Éireann in 1993 as a Senator for the Industrial and Commercial Panel, serving as Cathaoirleach, and was re-elected in 1997 to the 21st Seanad. At the 2002 general election, he was again an unsuccessful candidate for the Dáil in Dún Laoghaire, and he did not contest the Seanad elections of that year.

The Mahon Tribunal, set up to investigate allegations of corruption among Irish politicians, heard in 2003 that Cosgrave had accepted illegal payments from property developers in return for voting to rezone property in Dublin. He resigned from the Fine Gael party when this became known, thereby effectively ending his political career.

He did not seek re-election to Dún Laoghaire–Rathdown County Council at the 2004 local elections.

On 17 October 2005, Cosgrave pleaded guilty to a charge of failing to disclose to the Standards in Public Office Commission a political donation of £2,500 received from lobbyist Frank Dunlop in the course of the 1997 general election. He was sentenced on 26 May 2006 to perform 75 hours of community service in lieu of a six-month custodial sentence.

Mahon Tribunal
Cosgrave appeared at the Mahon Tribunal on 14 July 2006 in relation to a planning application from Monarch Properties to re-zone  at Cherrywood, County Dublin.

He told the Tribunal that his decision to support the re-zoning was not a U-turn in return for a political donation. But he could not recall the reason for his decision. He said that he could not recollect whether he had received any donations from Monarch, or other developers at the time; but that there could have been some.

Criminal Assets Bureau investigation and subsequent legal actions
An investigation of corruption was being instituted on the basis of bribes allegedly paid to councillors by Frank Dunlop to secure re-zoning on 16 December 1997. The re-zoning was investigated by the Mahon Tribunal in 2003.

On 26 October 2010, Cosgrave appeared at Dublin District Court charged with five offences. He is alleged to have received corrupt payments between 1992 and 1997 in relation to the re-zoning of Jackson Way Properties Ltd.

In April 2012, he failed in his attempt to stop his trial on corruption charges. The Supreme Court upheld the High Court's decision by a majority of three to two. He went on trial in the Dublin Circuit Criminal Court on 4 July 2013, on five counts of corruptly receiving money on dates between June 1992 and December 1997.

The trial subsequently collapsed, and a nolle prosequi verdict was entered on the record.

References

1956 births
Living people
Cathaoirligh of Seanad Éireann
Children of Taoisigh
Liam Thomas
Councillors of Dublin County Council
Fine Gael TDs
Local councillors in Dún Laoghaire–Rathdown
Members of the 19th Seanad
Members of the 20th Seanad
Members of the 21st Seanad
Members of the 22nd Dáil
Members of the 23rd Dáil
Members of the 24th Dáil
People educated at Castleknock College
Fine Gael senators